Rishivandiyam is a state assembly constituency in Kallakurichi district of Tamil Nadu, India. Its State Assembly Constituency number is 78. It comprises portions of the Tirukkoyilur and Sankarapuram taluks. It is part of the Kallakurichi constituency for national elections to the Parliament of India. It is one of the 234 State Legislative Assembly Constituencies in Tamil Nadu.

Demographics

Madras State 

Senguntha Mudaliyar candidate won seven times in this constituency.

Tamil Nadu

Election results

2021

2016

2011

2006

2001

1996

1991

1989

1984

1980

1977

1971

1967

1962

References 

 

Assembly constituencies of Tamil Nadu
Viluppuram district